Eospilarctia fangchenglaiae is a moth of the family Erebidae first described by Vladimir Viktorovitch Dubatolov, Yasunori Kishida and Min Wang in 2008. It is found in the Chinese provinces of Sichuan, Yunnan, Guangdong, Zhejiang, Jiangxi, Shaanxi, Hubei and Hunan.

References

Moths described in 2008
Spilosomina